This is a list of notable events in country music that took place in the year 1988.

Events
 May 21 – Country music stars highlight a concert at Madison Square Garden in New York City. Featured: Alabama, The Judds, George Strait and Randy Travis.
 December –
 Record producer Jimmy Bowen establishes the Universal Records label.
 LS Records releases "Spelling on the Stone", a song about Elvis Presley without an artist credit. The song's lyrics, which call the singer's 1977 death into question, are sung by a vocalist whom many believe to be Presley himself.

No dates
Time-Life Records releases the first volume of its "Country USA" series. The series, which would eventually include 23 volumes, each chronicles one year per volume – 1950 through 1972. Each volume – offered on two record albums, or one cassette or compact disc – contains liner notes from some of country music's most respected historians. In many cases, the songs offered on each volume represented the first time they had ever been re-released on compact disc. "Country USA" was offered through television and magazine advertisements.
The Country Music Association Awards introduced a new award, Vocal Event of the Year, awarding collaborative efforts by two or more artists who normally don't work together (previously such efforts had to be included with Best Duo or Group nominations). The first recipient was the group of Emmylou Harris, Dolly Parton, and Linda Ronstadt for their Trio album.
MTM Records is sold and disestablished after four years. During its short stay in the music business, two songs released by MTM will top the Billboard Hot Country Singles chart: Judy Rodman's "Until I Met You" (1986) and S-K-O's "Baby's Got a New Baby" (1987).
Real Country, a 24-hour satellite music network focusing on classic country and neotraditional country, is planned for a 1989 launch by country star Buck Owens out of his Phoenix Arizona radio studios and carried by the Satellite Music Network. It is heard primarily in smaller- and medium-sized markets. Real Country was later sold to ABC Disney which then moved the operations to its radio headquarters in Dallas, Texas.  Real Country was later sold to Citadel and is now owned and distributed by Cumulus Media.

Top hits of the year

Singles released by American artists

Singles released by Canadian artists

Top new album releases

Other top albums
{| class="wikitable sortable"
|-
! US
! Album
! Artist
! Record Label
|-
| align="center"| 51
| 10
| John Anderson
| MCA
|-
| align="center"| 26
| Across the Rio Grande
| Holly Dunn
| MTM
|-
| align="center"| 46
| Alive & Well
| Larry Gatlin and the Gatlin Brothers
| Columbia
|-
| align="center"| 29
| All in Love
| Marie Osmond
| Capitol/Curb
|-
| align="center"| 29
| As I Am
| Anne Murray
| Capitol
|-
| align="center"| 36
| The Best of Eddy Raven
| Eddy Raven
| RCA
|-
| align="center"| 60
| Brand New
| Gary Stewart
| Hightone
|-
| align="center"| 52
| Chasing Rainbows
| Mickey Gilley
| Airborne
|-
| align="center"| 61
| A Christmas Tradition, Vol. II
| Various Artists
| Warner Bros.
|-
| align="center"| 29
| The Coast of Colorado
| Skip Ewing
| MCA
|-
| align="center"| 56
| Every Christmas
| Gary Morris
| Warner Bros.
|-
| align="center"| 33
| Exchange of Hearts
| David Slater
| Capitol
|-
| align="center"| 36
| Full Circle
| Waylon Jennings
| MCA
|-
| align="center"| 36
| The Gift
| The McCarters
| Warner Bros.
|-
| align="center"| 66
| Greatest Hits
| Kenny Rogers
| RCA
|-
| align="center"| 27
| Greatest Hits Volume Two
| Lee Greenwood
| MCA
|-
| align="center"| 33
| The Heart of It All
| Earl Thomas Conley
| RCA
|-
| align="center"| 49
| Higher Ground
| John Denver
| Windstar
|-
| align="center"| 37
| Hot Dog!
| Buck Owens
| Capitol
|-
| align="center"| 51
| I Guess I Just Missed You
| Canyon
| 16th Avenue
|-
| align="center"| 52
| I Never Made a Record I Didn't Like
| Ray Stevens
| MCA
|-
| align="center"| 34
| I Wanna Dance With You
| Eddie Rabbitt
| RCA
|-
| align="center"| 35
| I'll Be Your Jukebox Tonight
| Barbara Mandrell
| Capitol
|-
| align="center"| 36
| I'm Gonna Love Her on the Radio
| Charley Pride
| 16th Avenue
|-
| align="center"| 45
| I'm Still Missing You
| Ronnie McDowell
| Curb
|-
| align="center"| 33
| If My Heart Had Windows
| Patty Loveless
| MCA
|-
| align="center"| 64
| Just Enough Love
| Ray Price
| Step One
|-
| align="center"| 58
| Light Years
| Glen Campbell
| MCA
|-
| align="center"| 27
| Little Love Affairs
| Nanci Griffith
| MCA
|-
| align="center"| 60
| Live at the Opry
| Patsy Cline
| MCA
|-
| align="center"| 62
| Making Believe
| Conway Twitty & Loretta Lynn
| MCA
|-
| align="center"| 64
| New Faces of Country
| Various Artists
| K-Tel
|-
| align="center"| 28
| No Regrets
| Moe Bandy
| Curb
|-
| align="center"| 63
| Nobody's Angel
| Crystal Gayle
| Warner Bros.
|-
| align="center"| 51
| ''Now You're Talkin| Mel McDaniel
| Capitol
|-
| align="center"| 43
| One Fair Summer Evening
| Nanci Griffith
| MCA
|-
| align="center"| 45
| Rebels Without a Clue
| The Bellamy Brothers
| Curb/MCA
|-
| align="center"| 26
| Running
| The Desert Rose Band
| Curb/MCA
|-
| align="center"| 64
| Saddle the Wind
| Janie Frickie
| Columbia
|-
| align="center"| 30
| Sincerely
| The Forester Sisters
| Warner Bros.
|-
| align="center"| 28
| Still in Your Dreams
| Conway Twitty
| MCA
|-
| align="center"| 47
| Stout & High
| The Wagoneers
| A&M
|-
| align="center"| 47
| Swingin' Doors, Sawdust Floors
| Larry Boone
| Mercury
|-
| align="center"| 39
| View from the House
| Kim Carnes
| MCA
|-
| align="center"| 48
| Water from the Wells of Home
| Johnny Cash
| Mercury
|-
| align="center"| 34
| Western Standard Time
| Asleep at the Wheel
| Epic
|-
| align="center"| 33
| Wide Open
| Sawyer Brown
| Capitol/Curb
|-
| align="center"| 63
| Who Was That Stranger
| Loretta Lynn
| MCA
|-
| align="center"| 33
| Workin' Band
| Nitty Gritty Dirt Band
| Warner Bros.
|-
| align="center"| 27
| Zuma
| Southern Pacific
| Warner Bros.
|}

On television

Regular series
 Dolly (1987–1988, ABC)
 Hee Haw (1969–1993, syndicated)

Specials

Births
March 24 – Blanco Brown, country rap/trap performer best known for 2019's "The Git Up."
March 30 – Jordan Davis, singer of the 2010s ("Singles You Up")
April 29 – Michael Ray, singer-songwriter known for his 2015 debut hit "Kiss You in the Morning".
May 24 – Billy Gilman, the youngest artist to ever have a country hit record (2000's "One Voice").
July 20 – Julianne Hough, rising country music star and professional dancer, best known for her appearances on Dancing with the Stars.
August 21 – Kacey Musgraves, rising country music star of the 2010s.
November 17 – Reid Perry, member of The Band Perry.

Deaths
August 24 – Nat Stuckey, 54, singer-songwriter whose biggest hit-making time was the 1960s and 1970s (lung cancer).
September 20 – Leon McAuliffe, 71, prominent member of Bob Wills' Texas Playboys and a star in his own right.
December 6 – Roy Orbison, 52, American singer-songwriter and a pioneer of rock and roll.

Hall of Fame inductees

Country Music Hall of Fame inductees
Loretta Lynn (born 1932)
Roy Rogers (1911–1998)

Canadian Country Music Hall of Fame inductees
Jack Feeney

Major awards

Grammy AwardsBest Female Country Vocal Performance – "Hold Me", K. T. OslinBest Male Country Vocal Performance – Old 8×10, Randy TravisBest Country Performance by a Duo or Group with Vocal – "Give a Little Love". The JuddsBest Country Collaboration with Vocals – "Crying", Roy Orbison and k.d. langBest Country Instrumental Performance – "Sugarfoot Rag", Asleep at the WheelBest Country Song – "Hold Me", K. T. OslinBest Bluegrass Recording – "Southern Flavor", Bill Monroe

Juno AwardsCountry Male Vocalist of the Year – Murray McLauchlanCountry Female Vocalist of the Year – k.d. langCountry Group or Duo of the Year – Family Brown

Academy of Country MusicEntertainer of the Year – Hank Williams Jr.Song of the Year – "Eighteen Wheels and a Dozen Roses", Charles Nelson and Paul Nelson (Performer: Kathy Mattea)Single of the Year – "Eighteen Wheels and a Dozen Roses," Kathy MatteaAlbum of the Year – This Woman, K. T. OslinTop Male Vocalist – George StraitTop Female Vocalist – K. T. OslinTop Vocal Duo – The JuddsTop Vocal Group – Highway 101Top New Male Vocalist – Rodney CrowellTop New Female Vocalist – Suzy BoggussVideo of the Year – "Young Country", Hank Williams Jr. (Director: Bill Fishman)

 ARIA Awards 
(presented in Sydney on February 29, 1988)Best Country Album – This Town (Flying Emus)ARIA Hall of Fame – Slim Dusty

Canadian Country Music AssociationEntertainer of the Year – k.d. langMale Artist of the Year – Ian TysonFemale Artist of the Year – k.d. langGroup of the Year – Family BrownSOCAN Song of the Year – "One Smokey Rose", Tim Taylor (Performer: Anita Perras)Single of the Year – "One Smokey Rose", Anita PerrasAlbum of the Year – Shadowland, k.d. langTop Selling Album – Always & Forever, Randy TravisVista Rising Star Award – Blue RodeoDuo of the Year – Anita Perras and Tim Taylor

Country Music AssociationEntertainer of the Year – Hank Williams Jr.Song of the Year – "80's Ladies", K. T. Oslin (Performer: K. T. Oslin)Single of the Year – "Eighteen Wheels and a Dozen Roses", Kathy MatteaAlbum of the Year – Born to Boogie, Hank Williams Jr.Male Vocalist of the Year – Randy TravisFemale Vocalist of the Year – K. T. OslinVocal Duo of the Year – The JuddsVocal Group of the Year – Highway 101Horizon Award – Ricky Van SheltonVocal Event of the Year – Emmylou Harris, Dolly Parton, and Linda RonstadtMusician of the Year''' – Chet Atkins

Further reading
Kingsbury, Paul, "The Grand Ole Opry: History of Country Music. 70 Years of the Songs, the Stars and the Stories," Villard Books, Random House; Opryland USA, 1995
Kingsbury, Paul, "Vinyl Hayride: Country Music Album Covers 1947–1989," Country Music Foundation, 2003
Millard, Bob, "Country Music: 70 Years of America's Favorite Music," HarperCollins, New York, 1993
Whitburn, Joel, "Top Country Songs 1944–2005 – 6th Edition." 2005.

Other links
Country Music Association
Inductees of the Country Music Hall of Fame

References

External links
Country Music Hall of Fame

Country
Country music by year